Carlos Amado (born c. 1924 – 13 November 1985) was an Argentine rower. He competed in the men's eight event at the 1948 Summer Olympics.

References

External links
 

1920s births
1985 deaths
Argentine male rowers
Olympic rowers of Argentina
Rowers at the 1948 Summer Olympics
Place of birth missing